Muslim Khan was a member of the Bahujan Samaj Party and the Uttar Pradesh Legislative Assembly, 15th assembly of Dataganj (Assembly constituency) City of Usehat (in office 2007).

References 

Living people
Year of birth missing (living people)
Bahujan Samaj Party politicians from Uttar Pradesh